Xenorhabdus poinarii  is a bacterium from the genus of Xenorhabdus  which has been isolated from the nematodes Steinernema glaseri and Steinernema cubanum.

References

Further reading

External links
Type strain of Xenorhabdus poinarii at BacDive -  the Bacterial Diversity Metadatabase

Bacteria described in 1983